Ryan Davis (born April 12, 1997) is a Canadian football wide receiver for the Ottawa Redblacks of the Canadian Football League (CFL). He played college football at Auburn. He has also been a member of the New England Patriots (NFL) and Tampa Bay Vipers (XFL).

College career
Davis played at Auburn University from 2015 to 2018. While there he set the school record for career receptions with 178.

Professional career

New England Patriots 
Davis signed with the New England Patriots as an undrafted free agent in 2019. He was released by the Patriots that year before the season.

Tampa Bay Vipers 
In 2020, Davis played for the Tampa Bay Vipers of the XFL. He played in three games for the Vipers, catching two passes for six yards.

Ottawa Redblacks 
Davis signed with the Ottawa Redblacks of the CFL in 2021. Davis led the team with 55 receptions for 589 yards and also scored two touchdowns. He also contributed 9 carries for 43 yards. Davis was a nominee for CFL 'Most Outstanding Rookie' of the 2021 season.

References

External links
Auburn Tigers bio
Ottawa Redblacks bio

1997 births
Living people
American football wide receivers
Canadian football wide receivers
Auburn Tigers football players
Tampa Bay Vipers players
Ottawa Redblacks players